Arviat Airport  is located at Arviat, Nunavut, Canada, and is operated by the government of Nunavut.  Local taxis provide service between the hamlet and the airport for $7.

Airlines and destinations

See also
 Arviat Water Aerodrome

References

External links

Certified airports in the Kivalliq Region